Robert Allen Labonte (born May 8, 1964) is an American semi-retired professional stock car racing driver and current analyst for NASCAR on Fox. He also currently competes full-time in the Superstar Racing Experience, driving the No. 18 car. Labonte is the 2000 NASCAR Cup Series champion. He and his older brother, Terry Labonte, are one of only two pairs of brothers to have both won the Cup championships (along with Kurt Busch and Kyle Busch). He is also the uncle of former Xfinity Series race winner Justin Labonte.

Labonte is the first driver to have won both the Winston Cup championship (2000) and the Busch Series championship (1991) in both series current touring form. (Ned Jarrett previously won both under the old points championship format). Bobby also won the IROC title in 2001.  Labonte is also the first driver to complete the NASCAR Triple Threat at the same track, by winning races at Martinsville in each of NASCAR's top three racing series.

Racing career

Beginnings
Labonte was born on May 8, 1964, in Corpus Christi, Texas. He began racing in 1969 in quarter midgets in his home state of Texas, winning his first feature race one year later. From then until 1977, he drove in quarter-midgets throughout the United States, winning many races. In 1978, he advanced to the go-kart ranks but moved to North Carolina with his family following older brother Terry's advancement to the Winston Cup Series. In 1980, Bobby made his NASCAR International Sedan Series debut in Atlanta, finishing third. Bobby made his Busch Series debut in 1982 at Martinsville Speedway, finishing 30th. Following his graduation from Trinity High School, he worked as a fabricator on Terry's cars at Hagan Racing. Labonte returned to the Busch Series in 1985, running two races in a car he owned himself at Martinsville. In his first race, he finished 30th, bringing home only $220. In his next race, though, he finished in 17th, his best finish so far.

The next season, Bobby prepared his car, which Terry drove, and Terry won his first Busch pole position and finished second at Road Atlanta.

Labonte's main success came driving late-model stock cars. In 1987, Labonte won 12 races at Caraway Speedway, clinching the track championship, in addition to working for Jay Hedgecock. The following season, he competed at Concord Motorsports Park, winning six times, and ran six more Busch races, finishing 16th at Darlington Raceway. The next season, he ran seven more Busch Series races and had his first top-five finish at North Carolina Speedway. He had two more top-10s that year.

Xfinity Series (formerly Busch Grand National Series)

1990
By 1990, Labonte had finally earned enough money to race in the Busch Series full-time. He founded his team and drove the No. 44 Oldsmobile. He was successful, winning two poles (both at Bristol Motor Speedway), scoring six top-5s, and 17 top-10s. He ended up finishing fourth in the standings and was also voted the Busch Series' "Most Popular Driver."

1991
Next season, he continued his second-division success by winning the NASCAR Busch Series championship with two wins, 10 top-five, and 21 top-10 finishes. He also won his first Busch Series race, at Bristol, then won again at O'Reilly Raceway Park in August.
In addition to his Busch Series schedule, he made two Winston Cup starts in a Bobby Labonte Racing car at Dover International Speedway and Michigan International Speedway, finishing 34th and 38th, respectively. He won his first Busch Series title.

1992
His 1992 season was a successful one, and he ended up winning three races (at Lanier, Hickory, and Martinsville respectively), but lost the championship title to Joe Nemechek by three points. That championship finish is, to date, the second-closest finish in the history of NASCAR's top three series (behind the tiebreaker between Tony Stewart and Carl Edwards in the Sprint Cup Series in 2011).

1993
In 1993, Labonte was called up by Bill Davis Racing to drive in the Winston Cup Series. He signed a contract to drive the No. 22 Ford Thunderbird. In his rookie season, he won his first pole at Richmond International Raceway, collected six top-10s, and finished 19th in points. He was also second place behind Jeff Gordon for Rookie of the Year honors. He also competed in two Busch Series races, winning a pole and finishing second and 24th respectively. Also, Labonte continued to operate his main Busch Series team, hiring David Green to drive for him. Green finished third in points for Bobby Labonte Racing.

1994
The next season, 1994, Labonte achieved his second major success as a car owner when his Busch Series driver, David Green, won the championship. It was the second championship, and fifth top-five points finish in five years for Bobby Labonte Racing. He also ran in the Busch Series himself, making 12 starts and earning a victory at Michigan in August. In addition to his Busch Series exploits, Bobby continued running full-time in the Winston Cup series for Bill Davis Racing. He collected one top-5 and two top-10s and finished 21st in the standings, just missing out on the top 20 because of Todd Bodine's two-position points standings gain in the final race of the season.

1996–present
In 2007, Labonte won the Busch Series race at Talladega Speedway in April 2007, edging Tony Stewart to the line in a thrilling finish. This was his first Busch Series win since 1998. In the offseason following the 2007 season, Labonte agreed to a 15-race contract to drive the No. 21 Chevrolet for Richard Childress Racing in the now-Nationwide Series for the 2008 season. RCR's No. 21 team earned six victories in 2007 with driver Kevin Harvick and has earned two of the organization's four series championships.

In 2016, Labonte returned to Joe Gibbs Racing to compete in the Xfinity Series opener at Daytona, driving the No. 18 Camry.

Cup Series

1995–2000

At the end of the 1994 season, Labonte departed to replace Dale Jarrett as the driver of the No.18 Interstate Batteries-sponsored Chevrolet for Joe Gibbs Racing. Labonte would pick up his first career win in the Coca-Cola 600 in 1995, a win he would call in 2018 the favorite of his career. He would also go on to sweep the races at Michigan and finish 10th in the standings.

In 1996, Labonte won the season-ending race at Atlanta, the same race where his brother Terry won the championship. The two took a victory lap together in what Labonte said was one of the "most emotional and memorable moments of [his] life". That year, he finished 11th in the points standings.

In 1997, Gibbs switched car makes to a Pontiac Grand Prix. Labonte would go on to win the season-ending race at Atlanta for the second year in a row. He ended up seventh in the standings, his best finish at that point in his career.

In 1998, Labonte won at both Atlanta and Talladega, as well as pole positions for both Daytona races, finishing second to Dale Earnhardt in the 500. He finished the year in sixth in final points, improving by a position.

In 1999, Labonte won five Winston Cup races, the most he has ever won in a single season. He won at Dover in the spring, swept both Pocono races (he was the third to accomplish this particular sweep, after Bobby Allison in 1982 and Tim Richmond in 1986; since 1999, Jimmie Johnson in 2004, Denny Hamlin in 2006, and Dale Earnhardt Jr. in 2014 have also done this), the second Michigan race, and the season finale at Atlanta. However, during the season, he suffered a broken shoulder in an accident while qualifying for a Busch Series race at Darlington Raceway, but raced in the Cup event two days later. Labonte started the race, but at the 1st caution was relieved by Matt Kenseth. He finished second in the points to Dale Jarrett, losing the championship by 201 points.

In 2000, Labonte won four races, the early-season race at Rockingham, the Brickyard 400 at Indianapolis, the Southern 500 at Darlington, and the fall race at Charlotte. He led the point standings for 25 weeks straight after taking over at California, and never relinquished it on the way to winning the Winston Cup championship, finishing ahead of Earnhardt by 265 points, completing all but nine of the 10,167 laps that season, with 4 wins, 19 top-five finishes, 24 top ten finishes, 3 poles, an average finish of 7.4, and had zero DNF's. Labonte would become the second driver in NASCAR history to win the championship and NOT score a single DNF. Cale Yarborough became the very first driver to accomplish that feat in 1977. As of 2022, they are the only 2 drivers in history to do so.

2001–2005

Labonte began the 2001 season with a seventh-place finish in the Bud Shootout. At the Daytona 500, he and his teammate Tony Stewart were two of the 18 drivers involved in a crash on lap 173. Labonte's hood broke off and got attached to Stewart's car, which flipped over twice. After getting out of his, Labonte was seen checking on Stewart to make sure he was okay. The accident was overshadowed by Dale Earnhardt's fatal crash on the last lap of the same race.

The following week at Rockingham, Labonte was narrowly beaten to the finish line by Steve Park in the rain-delayed Dura Lube 400. He did not have another Top 10 finish until the Virginia 500 at Martinsville, where he finished in eighth. This was followed by a fifth-place finish in the Talladega 500. His next Top 10 was another fifth-place finish in the Coca-Cola 600. After less successful finishes at Dover and Michigan, Labonte had a second eighth-place finish at Pocono and a seventh-place finish at Sonoma, and a third fifth-place finish in the Pepsi 400. At the end of July, Labonte won his first points race of the year in the Pennsylvania 500 at Pocono.

After the win, Labonte's next Top 10 was a ninth-place finish at Watkins Glen, then eighth and third-place finishes at Bristol and Darlington, and a sixth-place finish at Richmond. He did not have back-to-back Top 10's again until the autumn races at Charlotte and Martinsville, where he finished 10th and fourth respectively.

In the fall at Talladega, Labonte started 34th. He managed to work his way up the field and took the lead on lap 107. He led for 23 laps before falling back in the pack. He retook the lead on lap 184 but was involved in a frightening last-lap crash. After leading three laps, Labonte was leading at the white flag on the outside lane. Going into turn 1, Dale Earnhardt Jr. overtook him in the lower groove, bringing Tony Stewart and Jeff Burton with him. Labonte moved up the track, trying to block Bobby Hamilton, but coming onto the back straightaway, Hamilton tapped him from behind. Labonte made contact with Johnny Benson Jr. — sending that driver into the outside wall — and then spun, flipping over, and skidding partway down the track on his roof. This crash also collected Jason Leffler, Sterling Marlin, Robby Gordon, Mike Wallace, Ricky Craven, Terry Labonte, Buckshot Jones, Ricky Rudd, Ward Burton, and more.

Labonte's next Top 10 was another ninth-place finish at Rockingham. After winning at Atlanta and a third-place finish at the postponed New Hampshire 300, he finished sixth in the final points standings.

During 2001, Labonte won the IROC XXV title, becoming the 13th consecutive NASCAR driver to win the IROC championship.

In 2002, Labonte only had one win, which was at Martinsville in the spring. He also drove a 9/11 Tribute car in 2002 with the phrase "Let's Roll" on the hood. It was his first career short-track win at Martinsville. He went on to finish 16th in the final points standings and failed to finish in the Top 10 for the first time since 1996, while his teammate Stewart went on to win the championship.

In 2003, Labonte rebounded and finished eighth in the standings after winning two races (Atlanta and Homestead [leading only the final lap]). Also, Labonte went on a tear during the spring with three straight second-place finishes.

In 2004, Labonte did not win a race for the first time since 1994 (ten years later) and finished 12th in the standings.

2005 saw much of the same. Labonte fell out of the Top 20 in points, and only had four Top 5s, one of which was a dramatic second at Lowe's Motor Speedway in the Coca-Cola 600. He also went on to race some Truck Series events, which included a win at Martinsville. His win there made him join an elite group of drivers that have won in all three divisions at one track. In fact, with his win, he became the first driver to do so.

He also ran the 24 Hours of Daytona road race, sharing a car with his brother Terry, Jan Magnussen and Bryan Herta. After the disappointing 2005 season, Labonte asked and was granted to be released from Joe Gibbs Racing, having spent the last eleven seasons there. Labonte joined Petty Enterprises to drive the famous No. 43.

2006–2008

In his inaugural season in the famous No. 43 car, Labonte collected three Top 5's and eight Top 10's. His Top 5's included an impressive run at the Martinsville Speedway, where he finished third after being in contention for the win much of the day. He ended up finishing 21st in the points standings, three spots better than he did two years before.

Labonte began the 2007 season with a 21st-place finish in the Daytona 500, after avoiding the many accidents the race had. Labonte would end the year with no Top 5's and only three Top 10's. However, due to a more consistent season, he finished 18th in the standings, a three-position improvement over 2006. In November, Labonte formed a full-service marketing agency, Breaking Limits, which is based in Huntersville, North Carolina.

In 2008, Labonte continued his contract with Petty Enterprises, but experienced a largely unsuccessful season, gathering only three Top 10's and no Top 5's on his way to finishing 21st in the Sprint Cup point standings. In December of that year, Labonte was released from Petty Enterprises while the team was negotiating a deal with a private equity firm that fell through, and Petty partnered with Gillett Evernham Motorsports.

2009
On January 13, 2009, Labonte was confirmed to be the driver of the No. 96 Ford Fusion for Hall of Fame Racing, now in a partnership with Yates Racing. In the 2009 Spring Las Vegas race, the Shelby 427, Labonte recorded his first Top 5 with Hall of Fame Racing and his best finish since he finished third in the Fall Martinsville race in 2006. However, that was his only Top 5 run for the year. With eleven races remaining in the 2009 season, Labonte was replaced for Erik Darnell for 7 of the final eleven races due to sponsorship problems with the No. 96. Labonte found a ride with TRG Motorsports and it's 71 for the 7 races he was out of the 96. In his first race at Atlanta, Labonte ran inside the Top 20 all night and scored an 18th-place finish. Two races later Labonte gave TRG its best qualifying effort with an eighth-place start, Labonte came home 22nd. At Talladega, Labonte finished 10th after, at one point, running second in that race to Dale Earnhardt Jr.

2010

From February 2010 – June 2010, Labonte drove for TRG Motorsports and its No. 71. Even though TRG's 2009 owner points were not enough to make the field guaranteed for the first five races of 2010, Labonte's past championship provisional gave the team that to fall back on, in the case that Labonte's qualifying runs are not fast. For 2010, Labonte was also reunited with Doug Randolph as his crew chief. Randolph finished the 2007 season with Labonte in the No. 43 for Petty Enterprises, posting two of three of Labonte's Top 10 runs. TRG also announced an alliance with Richard Childress Racing for 2010. RCR shared technology and equipment with TRG for the season. They also allied with Stewart Haas Racing, as Tony Stewart will provide a pit crew to the team.

In his first race in the TRG, Labonte finished 21st in the Daytona 500 after he started 42nd with a champions provisional. For much of the race, Labonte was in the Top 25. He would end up fading back over the next few races, as he and the team would struggle for consistency. On the May 16th Dover race, due to lack of sponsorship, Labonte and the 71 team parked the car after 66 laps. Arguably, some people might say that this season is the worst of his full-time career, as he only had two top 20 finishes in 2010 one at the Daytona 500 and one at the Infineon Raceway road course event.

On June 22, 2010, it was announced that Labonte would be leaving the No. 71 due to the team being unable to secure sponsorship. On June 23, Labonte was hired to drive car No. 7 for Robby Gordon Motorsports at New Hampshire in a one-race deal.

C&J Energy Services entered into a partnership with Phoenix Racing which allowed Labonte to be hired to take over the No. 09 car beginning at Daytona and Labonte split the rest of the 2010 season between Phoenix Racing and TRG Motorsports. On October 11, Stavola-Labonte Racing hired Labonte to drive its No. 10 car at Charlotte and Texas in a two-race deal. The team is co-owned by Bobby's older brother Terry. Despite bouncing around, Labonte competed in every race for the 2010 season.

2011–2012

Labonte replaced Marcos Ambrose as the full-time driver of the No. 47 JTG Daugherty Racing Toyota Camry, with support from Michael Waltrip Racing. He finished 4th in the Daytona 500, earning Labonte his 200th career top 10 finish in the NASCAR Sprint Cup Series. Earning only one more top 10 finish so far in the season. JTG Daugherty Racing and Michael Waltrip Racing received a penalty for violating sections 12-1, 12-4-J, and 20-3.2.1A. Crew Chief Frankie Kerr was fined $50,000 and was suspended from 4 NASCAR Sprint Cup Championship events, and suspended from NASCAR until November, 23. The same penalty was for Michael Waltrip Racing and the car chief for each team. The owners of the numbers 47 (Tad Geschickter); 56 (Michael Waltrip); and 00 (Rob Kauffman); were penalized 25 owner points. The drivers were also penalized 25 driver points.

For the 2012 season, Labonte returned to the No. 47 car with most of the sponsors returning also. JTG Daugherty Racing also announced they will no longer operate out of the Michael Waltrip Racing shop. Todd Berrier took over the role as the crew chief. The crew chief at the time, Frank Kerr, moved to the position of shop foreman.

2013–2016
Labonte ran in the 47 for the entire season until the 2013 Quicken Loans 400 at Michigan International Speedway, in which he ran the No. 51 for Phoenix Racing. Labonte ran at Sonoma Raceway in the 47, but was subsequently replaced by A. J. Allmendinger in the 47 for selected races starting at the 2013 Quaker State 400 at Kentucky Speedway, ending Labonte's streak of consecutive starts at 704. The streak was second only to Jeff Gordon's. Later in the year Labonte suffered broken ribs in a cycling accident, forcing him to miss three races, starting with the AdvoCare 500 at Atlanta.

His last race with JTG Daughtery was at Phoenix International Raceway in November 2013; released afterwards, in December 2013 he announced that he would be running part-time in the 2014 NASCAR Sprint Cup Series in a second car for HScott Motorsports. During practice for the 2014 Daytona 500 Labonte blew an engine, and although he qualified for his 22nd consecutive 500, he was relegated to the back of the starting grid. Labonte finished the race in 15th.

A deal to run for James Finch in additional races fell through, thus Labonte did not make another start for the first half of the season. Instead, he tested cars for Richard Childress Racing.  At the summer Daytona race, he drove the No. 33 RCR Chevrolet that Brian Scott had driven to the pole at Talladega, running under the Circle Sport banner.  Labonte qualified 4th and contended for the lead at the beginning of the race, but was caught up in the Big One, finishing 26th. Tommy Baldwin Racing would field the No. 37 car with Accell Construction as the sponsor for Labonte at Indianapolis.

In December 2014, Labonte announced that he would drive for Go FAS Racing on the restrictor-plate tracks in 2015, taking over for his brother Terry who retired after the 2014 GEICO 500. He finished 24th at the 2015 Daytona 500. In the spring Talladega race, Labonte finished 27th. The 2015 Coke Zero 400 did not go well for Labonte, as he was caught up in an early crash caused by David Gilliland and finished 43rd. For the Fall Talladega race, he finished 23rd, his best finish of the season. In 2016, Labonte received the sponsorship of Bombardier Recreational Products and Cyclops Gear allowing him to run the four restrictor-plate races for Go FAS Racing.  For the Daytona 500, Labonte would finish 31st. For Talladega, Labonte would finish 19th. Coming back to Daytona, Labonte would finish 24th. Coming back to Talladega, Labonte would finish 31st. Following the 2016 season, it was announced that Labonte would not return to Go FAS.

Whelen Euro Series
In June 2017, Labonte competed in the NASCAR Whelen Euro Series race weekend at Brands Hatch, driving the No. 1 Ford for Alex Caffi Motorsport. He became the first Cup Series champion to race in the Euro Series. He started 22nd in both of the weekend's two races, and finished 10th and 14th.

In 2018, Labonte joined RDV Competition to drive the No. 18 Toyota full-time in the Euro Series.

Modifieds / SRX (2021-)
Labonte began competing on the SMART Modified Tour in 2021. He won two features in 2021 but couldn't run full-time because of conflicts with him racing in the Superstar Racing Experience (SRX). In 2022, the two series do not have conflicting dates and he is competing full-time on the SMART Tour.

Broadcasting career
In February 2014, it was announced that Labonte would appear as a racing analyst for the new program NASCAR America on NBCSN. He made his TV debut early in the 2014 season.

In 2017, Labonte moved to FS1 as an analyst on Race Hub and Race Day programs.

Personal life
Labonte currently resides in High Point, North Carolina with his wife Kristin. He has two children from his previous marriage to Donna Slate, Robert Tyler, and Madison, and is an avid outdoorsman.  Tyler recently graduated from Texas A&M and is now in law school at Campbell University in Buies Creek, North Carolina.  Tyler has worked on political campaigns for Thom Tillis and served in 2014 as an intern for Interstate Batteries, which sponsored Bobby's 2000 championship season. Madison began school at Appalachian State University in the spring of 2017.

Labonte also owns Breaking Limits, a marketing, public relations, events and sponsorship agency, working out of High Point, North Carolina.  Labonte continues to own a Red Mango yogurt shop on the campus of Duke University. The Bobby Labonte Foundation continues to provide grants to non-profit organizations located in the Triad of North Carolina whose work supports building stronger foundations for children and their families. Labonte also founded Longhorn Chassis with his brother Terry in 2010. Longhorn Chassis builds dirt late model race cars.

Motorsports career results

NASCAR
(key) (Bold – Pole position awarded by qualifying time. Italics – Pole position earned by points standings or practice time. * – Most laps led.)

Sprint Cup Series

Daytona 500

Xfinity Series

Craftsman Truck Series

Whelen Euro Series – Elite 1

 Season still in progress 
 Ineligible for series points

International Race of Champions
(key) (Bold – Pole position. * – Most laps led.)

24 Hours of Daytona
(key)

Superstar Racing Experience
(key) * – Most laps led. 1 – Heat 1 winner. 2 – Heat 2 winner.

 Season still in progress

References

External links
 
 
 
 Bobby Labonte at NASCAR.com

Living people
1964 births
Sportspeople from Corpus Christi, Texas
Racing drivers from Texas
24 Hours of Daytona drivers
NASCAR drivers
NASCAR Cup Series champions
NASCAR Xfinity Series champions
NASCAR team owners
International Race of Champions drivers
Rolex Sports Car Series drivers
Joe Gibbs Racing drivers
NASCAR Hall of Fame inductees
Richard Childress Racing drivers